Prince Bhekimpi Alpheus Dlamini (26 November 1924 – 1 November 1999) was Prime Minister of Swaziland from 25 March 1983 to 6 October 1986.

Dlamini was a Swazi politician known to be pro-South African and traditionalist. He was elected as Prime Minister in place of Prince Mabandla Dlamini after there were conflicts between Mabandla and other members of congress led by Mfanasibili Dlamini during the regency of Queen Dzeliwe. Dzeliwe was against this change and this led to her dismissal from the post of regent by Queen Ntombi.

Bhekimpi started persecution of those who had fled the South African apartheid regime. After student protests, he also closed the University of Swaziland; all of these provoked the resurgence of the Movement for Swazi Liberation, then led by Prince Clement Dusima Dlamini. He was dismissed by King Mswati III of Swaziland, after holding power for only three years.

1924 births
1999 deaths
Prime Ministers of Eswatini
Swazi royalty